is a system of braille for transcribing written Japanese. It supplements Japanese Braille by providing a means of directly encoding kanji characters without having to first convert them to kana. It uses an 8-dot braille cell, with the lower six dots corresponding to the cells of standard Japanese Braille, and the upper two dots indicating the constituent parts of the kanji. The upper dots are numbered 0 (upper left) and 7 (upper right), the opposite convention of 8-dot braille in Western countries, where the extra dots are added to the bottom of the cell. A kanji will be transcribed by anywhere from one to three braille cells.

Principles

Only kanji use the upper dots 0 and 7. A cell occupying only dots 1–6 is to be read as kana, or less commonly as the middle element of a three-cell kanji.

Kana readings are used to derive common kanji elements that share that reading. For example, the kana   ki is used for elements based on the kanji , which has ki as one of its basic pronunciations. The two upper dots are then used to indicate whether this is a whole character, or an element of a compound character. For a whole character, both upper dots are added, for   ki. For those kanji where an element is repeated more than once, a suffix corresponding derived from the braille digit plus a right upper dot indicates the number of times an element occurs, as in  = .

That is, the kana   ki is the basis for the kanji   ki, as well as the two components of   hayashi, and combined with the digit   it forms   mori.

Kantenji are frequently abbreviated. For example, the kana   u is used for the 'roof' radical, which is conventionally pronounced u. Thus, combined with the kanji   ko (from the kana   ko), it forms the compound character   ji (as in  kanji). However, in print the 'roof' radical is not normally used as an independent kanji, so in kantenji it is used as an abbreviation for the most common kanji with the roof radical,   ie "house".

A more extreme abbreviation is  koi "love".

Because there are only 63 six-dot patterns that kantenji can be based on, while there are significantly more elements from which kanji are built in print (for instance, the 214 radicals), each of the kantenji patterns corresponds to several components in print. Most are visually or thematically linked. For example, the kana   so is the arbitrary basis for the kanji   uma "horse". The kanji  sō, on the other hand, is based on the same braille pattern, despite having nothing to do with the horse radical or its meaning, because it is the historical basis of the kana  so. Thus  (selector 4 + ) is  sō. The selectors are generally only used for individual kanji.

The order of the cells is sometimes reversed to distinguish kanji that would otherwise be written the same in braille. Tricks such as reordering and abbreviation help use the 4,000 two-cell combinations. However, for rarer kanji, three cells are required.

Kantenji elements
The 63 basic 6-dot braille patterns are used to define 57 kanji elements and six selectors that build more complex characters from constituent parts. The blank 6-dot braille pattern always indicates a space, and is otherwise unused in kantenji. Numerals are as in international braille (without the number indicator).

{| class="wikitable" style="text-align:center"
|+ Standard Japanese Braille kana and Kantenji assignments
|-
! width="9%" | Kantenji cell 
! width="6%" | Kana 
! width="10%" | Kantenji element 
| rowspan="17" style="border-top:#aaaaaa hidden; border-bottom:#aaaaaa hidden;" |  
! width="9%" | Kantenji cell 
! width="6%" | Kana 
! width="10%" | Kantenji element 
| rowspan="17" style="border-top:#aaaaaa hidden; border-bottom:#aaaaaa hidden;" |  
! width="9%" | Kantenji cell 
! width="6%" | Kana 
! width="10%" | Kantenji element 
| rowspan="17" style="border-top:#aaaaaa hidden; border-bottom:#aaaaaa hidden;" |  
! width="9%" | Kantenji cell 
! width="6%" | Kana 
! width="10%" | Kantenji element 
|-
| || space ||  ||  ||  || selector 1 /  ||  ||  || selector 2 ||  ||  ||  / 
|-
| ||  || selector 3 ||  ||  ||  ||  ||  ||  ||  ||  || 
|-
| || -y- || selector 4 ||  ||  ||  /  ||  ||  ||  /  ||  ||  || 
|-
| ||  ||  ||  ||  ||  ||  ||  ||  ||  ||  || 
|-
| ||  || selector 5 ||  ||  ||  /  ||  || chōon ||  ||  ||  || 
|-
| ||  ||  ||  ||  ||  ||  ||  ||  ||  ||  || 
|-
| || -y- +  ||  ||  ||  ||  /  ||  ||  ||  /  ||  ||  || 
|-
| ||  ||  ||  ||  ||  ||  ||  ||  ||  ||  || 
|-
| ||  || selector 6 ||  ||  ||  ||  ||  ||  ||  ||  || 
|-
| ||  ||  /  ||  ||  ||  ||  ||  ||  ||  ||  || 
|-
| || -y- +  ||  ||  ||  ||  ||  ||  ||  ||  ||  || 
|-
| ||  ||  ||  ||  ||  ||  ||  ||  ||  ||  || 
|-
| ||  +  ||  ||  ||  ||  ||  ||  ||  ||  ||  || 
|-
| ||  ||  ||  ||  ||  ||  ||  ||  ||  ||  || 
|-
| || -y- +  +  ||  ||  ||  ||  ||  ||  ||  ||  ||  || 
|-
| || numbers ||  ||  ||  ||  ||  ||  ||  ||  ||  || 
|}

Single-cell kantenji characters

Kantenji with both upper dots raised indicate a single-cell kantenji character. These are all common characters, and they generally define the archetype for character components based on a dot pattern.

{| class=wikitable
|-
|  
|  
|  
|  
|  
|  
|  
|  
|  
|  
|  
|  
|-
|  
|  
|  
|  
|  
|  
|  
|  
|  
|  
|  
|  
|-
|  
|  
|  
|  
|  
|  
|  
|  
|  
|  
|  
|  
|-
|  
|  
|  
|  
|  
|  
|  
|  
|  
|  
|  
|  
|-
|  
|  
|  
|  
|  
|  
|  
|  
|  
|}

Double-cell variant kantenji characters

Another kantenji form uses a base character with a selector (a 6-dot pattern with a single raised dot) either preceding or following to indicate a variant on the archetype of the dot pattern. When a base character is followed by selectors 4, 5, or 6, it usually indicates a variant with a single stroke added or removed from the base character. Variant kantenji are composed the same as a regular double-cell kantenji, with dot 0 (upper left) raised in the first cell, and dot 7 (upper right) raised in the second.

   + selector 1 = 
   + selector 2 = 
   + selector 3 = 
  selector 4 +  = 
   + selector 1 = 
   + selector 2 = 
   + selector 1 = 
   + selector 3 = 
   + selector 4 = 
   + selector 5 = 
   + selector 6 =

Double-cell thematic kantenji characters

Some kantenji sharing a common element are linked thematically, rather than structurally. The first cell indicates the general concept, and the second cell will be a determiner, pinning down the specific meaning and the character associated with it. The determiner is usually by pronunciation, although determiners can be associated by meaning as well. Like the base kantenji of variants, thematic determiners can be used in making composed kantenji, e.g.   can be used for the element  in composed kantenji, as its thematic kantenji is   +  = .

   +  = 
   +  = 
   +  = 
   +  = 
   +  = 
   +  = 
   +  = 
   +  = 
   +  = 
   +  = 
and so on.

Double-cell composed kantenji characters

The most common kantenji form uses a two cell pattern, the first with the upper left dot raised, the second with the upper right raised. The dot patterns indicate the two basic elements that comprise the composed kanji. Note that variant elements are often represented by the base kantenji and thematic elements by their determiners.

   +  = 
   +  = 
   +  = 
   +  = 
   +  = 
   +  = 
   +  = 
   +  =

Duplicative and multi-cell composed kantenji

More complex kanji can be composed in two different ways, depending on whether they are composed of a single element, repeated, or multiple distinct elements. A kanji composed of a duplicated element can be indicated by a base character followed by the braille numeral counting repetitions of the element. Note that a single repeat is indicated by simply repeating the element in a standard double-cell kantenji. A complex kantenji can also be composed like a regular double-cell kantenji, adding a middle cell with neither upper dot raised. The last cell is always indicated by the upper right dot, no matter the length of the composed kantenji.

   +  = 
   +  +  =

Reversed kantenji

Some kantenji patterns can be used to write two or more common kanji, while reversing the elements would not signify any common characters. When this happens, the reversed form can be used to signify that second kanji.

   +  = 
   +  = 
   +  = 
   +  =

Text
A sample text:

{|
|- align=center
|||||||||||||
|- align=center
||||| ||||||||
|}
Kusamakura – Natsume Sōseki

{|
|- align=center
|||||||||||||||||||
|- align=center
|||||||||||||||||||
|}

Approach everything rationally, and you become harsh.

{|
|- align=center
|||||||||||||||||||||
|- align=center
|||||||||||||||||||||
|}

Paddle along in the stream of emotions, and you will be swept away in the current.

{|
|- align=center
|||||||||||||||||||
|- align=center
|||||||||||||||||||
|}

Give free rein to your desires, and you become uncomfortably confined.

References

Encodings of Japanese
Innovative braille scripts
8-dot braille scripts